Ulrikke Pia Eikeri (born 16 December 1992) is a Norwegian tennis player.

Eikeri has won one doubles title on the WTA Tour, one doubles title on WTA Challenger Tour and 11 singles titles and 30 doubles titles on the ITF Circuit. She reached the mixed doubles final at the 2022 French Open alongside Joran Vliegen. 

In 2022, she peaked at No. 40 in the WTA doubles rankings. She reached a best singles ranking of world No. 206 on 16 April 2018.

On the ITF Junior Circuit, Eikeri had been ranked as high as No. 16 in the world.

Playing for the Norway Billie Jean King Cup team, she has a win–loss record of 32–19.

Career

2010: Juniors
In 2010, Eikeri reached the semifinals of the Australian Open in girls' doubles alongside Camila Silva.

2021: First doubles title
Eikeri won her first WTA Tour title in doubles in October 2021, playing alongside Ellen Perez at the 2021 Tenerife Open.

2022: Historic mixed doubles final
At the 2022 French Open she reached the final in mixed doubles on her debut partnering Joran Vliegen defeating 2021 Wimbledon champions Desirae Krawczyk and Neal Skupski in the process. They lost in the final to Ena Shibahara and Wesley Koolhof. By making her first Major final in her first try at mixed doubles, Ulrikke Eikeri became Norway's first Grand Slam finalist in the Open Era.

2023
Eikeri competed for Norway at the 2023 United Cup.

Performance timelines

Only main-draw results in WTA Tour, Grand Slam tournaments, Fed Cup/Billie Jean King Cup and Olympic Games are included in win–loss records.

Singles
Current after the 2023 United Cup.

Doubles
Current after the 2023 Australian Open.

Significant finals

Grand slam finals

Mixed doubles: 1 (runner-up)

WTA career finals

Doubles: 3 (1 title, 2 runner-ups)

WTA Challenger finals

Doubles: 1 (title)

ITF Circuit finals

Singles: 19 (11 titles, 8 runner–ups)

Doubles: 44 (30 titles, 14 runner–ups)

Fed Cup/Billie Jean King Cup participation

Singles: 34 (21–13)

Doubles: 17 (11–6)

United Cup (0–4)

Notes

References

External links

 
 
 
 

1992 births
Living people
Sportspeople from Oslo
Norwegian female tennis players
21st-century Norwegian women